Justin H. Shipley (born June 5, 1980) is an American professional stock car racing driver. He last competed part-time in the NASCAR Gander Outdoors Truck Series, driving the No. 80 Ford F-150 for Jacob Wallace Racing.

Racing career

Gander Outdoors Truck Series
Shipley began his NASCAR career in 2016, driving the No. 80 Ford F-150 for Jacob Wallace Racing at the Eldora Dirt Derby. He started 13th but finished 31st due to his engine overheating. In the following two years, Shipley has raced at both Eldora Dirt Derbys, driving the same truck.

In 2017, Shipley started 21st and finished 25th due to engine problems.

In 2018, Shipley started 16th and finished 26th, two laps down.

Motorsports career results

NASCAR
(key) (Bold – Pole position awarded by qualifying time. Italics – Pole position earned by points standings or practice time. * – Most laps led.)

Gander Outdoors Truck Series

 Season still in progress
 Ineligible for series points

References

External links
 

Living people
1980 births
NASCAR drivers
Racing drivers from Georgia (U.S. state)